Gerard Rowlinson (born 15 August 1941) is a British former swimmer. He competed in the men's 200 metre breaststroke at the 1960 Summer Olympics.

At the ASA National British Championships, he won the 220 yards breaststroke title in 1959 and 1960.

References

1941 births
Living people
British male swimmers
Olympic swimmers of Great Britain
Swimmers at the 1960 Summer Olympics
People from Farnworth
British male breaststroke swimmers